Juan Martín del Potro and Travis Parrott were the defending champions, but chose not to participate that year.

Ashley Fisher and Tripp Phillips won in the final 3–6, 6–3, [10–5], against Scott Lipsky and David Martin.

Seeds

Draw

Draw

External links
 Draw

Doubles